Matt Doherty is a Northern Irish former professional footballer.

An attacking half-back, noted for his footwork and passing, Doherty was one of Derry City FC's early stars. During his time at the Brandywell he picked up winner's medals in the City Cup and North-West Cup, played in Derry's 2–0 defeat to Linfield FC in the 1936 Irish Cup final, and in 1938 came within a whisker of helping the club to their first league title, Derry losing 3–1 to Belfast Celtic in a replayed title-deciding test match.

1937–38 was perhaps Doherty's finest season, selected by both Ireland and the Irish League XI. In September 1937 he came extremely close to signing for Burnley FC before Derry rejected their £1,000 offer. He did finally leave the Brandywell in 1941, joining Shamrock Rovers in the League of Ireland, where he earned three League of Ireland XI caps while at Glenmalure Park.

He returned to Derry after World War II and finally tasted success in the Irish Cup.

He was awarded a benefit game on 4 May 1955 against Shamrock Rovers.

Doherty, who also managed the club from late 1959 until the end of the 1960–61 Irish League season, is father to Matt Jr. who also later went on to play for Derry.

Honours
 IFA Cup:
 1948–49
 City Cup: 2
 1934–35, 1936–37

External links
Matt Doherty on a Blogspot page
Matt Dohertyon the Derry City FC website 

Association footballers from Northern Ireland
Pre-1950 IFA international footballers
Derry City F.C. players
Shamrock Rovers F.C. players
League of Ireland players
Derry City F.C. managers
Possibly living people
Year of birth missing (living people)
League of Ireland XI players
20th-century births
Irish League representative players
Association football wing halves
Football managers from Northern Ireland